During the 2017–18 season, CA Osasuna competed in the Segunda División and the Copa del Rey.

Squad

Transfers
List of Spanish football transfers summer 2017#Osasuna

In

Out

Competitions

Overall

Liga

League table

Matches

Kickoff times are in CET.

Copa del Rey

References

CA Osasuna seasons
CA Osasuna